The 1836 United States presidential election in Virginia took place between November 3 and December 7, 1836, as part of the 1836 United States presidential election. Voters chose 23 representatives, or electors to the Electoral College, who voted for President and Vice President.

Virginia voted for the Democratic candidate, Martin Van Buren, over Whig candidate Hugh White. Van Buren won Virginia by a margin of 13.29%. While Van Buren's national running mate was Richard Mentor Johnson, the Virginia Democratic electors refused to support his candidacy and voted for William Smith of South Carolina.

Results

References

Virginia
1836
1836 Virginia elections